Balkan folk music is the traditional folk music within Balkan region. It's also known as narodna muzika (Bulgarian, Macedonian), also folk muzika (фолк музика) means folk music in the South Slavic languages (Serbo-Croatian, Bulgarian and Macedonian. In Slovene it is known as narodna glasba and in Croatia it is also alternatively called narodna glazba.

For more information regarding individual nations' folk music see: 

Bosnian folk music
Bulgarian folk music
Croatian folk music
Macedonian folk music
Montenegrin folk music
Serbian folk music
Slovenian folk music

External links
Yugomania music
Narodna Muzika, listen to Yugoslav folk music

Yugoslav music
Balkan music
+